OSCON may refer to:

OS-CON, a type of electronic capacitor
O'Reilly Open Source Convention
Oscon (Open Source CONtract), the most used open-contract in Italy.